Mathurapur or Mothurapur can refer to:

In India
In Diamond Harbour subdivision of South 24 Parganas district in the Indian state of West Bengal:
 Mathurapur, South 24 Parganas, a census town
 Mathurapur I (community development block), 
 Mathurapur II (community development block)
 Former Mathurapur (Vidhan Sabha constituency), now Raidighi (Vidhan Sabha constituency)
 Mathurapur (Lok Sabha constituency)

In Basirhat subdivision of North 24 Parganas district in the Indian state of West Bengal:
 Mathurapur, North 24 Parganas, a census town

In Malda district in the Indian state of West Bengal:
 Mathurapur, Malda, a village

In Bangladesh
 A village in Madhukhali Upazila of Faridpur District, noted for Mathurapur Deul
 A union in Badalgachhi Upazila of Naogaon District
 A union in Daulatpur Upazila of Kushtia District
 A union in Dhunat Upazila of Bogra District